The 1998 DFB-Ligapokal was the second edition of the DFB-Ligapokal. In a repeat of last year's competition, Bayern Munich beat VfB Stuttgart in the final.

Participating clubs
A total of six teams qualified for the competition. The labels in the parentheses show how each team qualified for the place of its starting round:
1st, 2nd, 3rd, 4th, etc.: League position
CW: Cup winners
TH: Title holders

Notes

Matches

Preliminary round

Semi-finals

Final

References

DFL-Ligapokal seasons
Ligapokal